Sarkaari Hiriya Praathamika Shaale, Kaasaragodu, Koduge: Raamanna Rai  is a 2018 Indian Kannada language socio-political comedy film written, directed and produced by Rishab Shetty, presented by Sudeep. The film stars Anant Nag, Ranjan, Sampath, Pramod Shetty, Saptha Pavoor, Mahendra, Sohan Shetty, Prakash Thuminad, Manish Heroor and others. 

It was declared a Blockbuster at the box office. 
In 2019, it won the National Film Award for Best Children's Film, at the 66th National Film Awards.

Plot
In the milieu of Kasaragod (a border district in Kerala having a large Kannada speaking population), where the language supremacy becomes the hothead matter. A Kannada-medium Government-run Middle and High School, faces financial difficulties due to nonreceipt of money from the government officials. As a consequence, various expenses like books, uniforms, teachers' salaries, building repairs and extracurricular activities are virtually at a standstill. 

Nambiar, the righteous Principal is being harassed by a hostile and corrupt Government official, Balakrishna Panikker, who is hell-bent upon closing the school as he wants to establish the supremacy of Malayalam. In a moment of weakness, Nambiar is forced to sign on a government order without reading it, which declares that the building is unsafe and needs to be demolished. A group of students coming from normal middle class to poor background are bound by the common thread of learning in Kannada. Their lives are thrown into turmoil when Panikker comes with a government order to physically close the school. 

They then decide to get a famous person to fight their case. Accordingly, they chance upon the name of one social worker in Mysore, Ananthapadmanabha in a newspaper. They then journey to Mysuru to persuade Ananthapadmanabha to take up their case. In a hilarious twist, there are two Ananthapadmanabhas living next to each other and both these friends are at loggerheads over trivial issues. The boys are supposed to talk to Ananthapadmanabha.M but instead, end up talking to Ananthapadmanabha.P, who agrees to take up their struggle.

With a lot of hope, they bring the 'famous' Ananthapadmanabha.P to Kasargod. After initial skirmishes with Panikker, it appears that the boys are fighting a losing battle. There are many minor events that help in crystallizing a hitherto scattered struggle into a cohesive well-oiled movement. The parents of the children also get involved in the same under the leadership of Ananthapadmanabha. The culmination of this is a court scene under a sympathetic judge. Ananthapadmanabha, though not a lawyer himself, is allowed to argue on behalf of the students. 

Ananthapadmanabha exposes the machinations of Panikker, arguing that the pictures of the abandoned school are photoshopped and concludes the case triumphantly. Being involved with the kids makes him realize how lonely he was. He then decides to remain in Kasargod as a part-time teacher in the school. Realising his mistakes, Ananthapadmanabha M. visits the school and gives Ananthapadmanabha P. his best wishes. The film ends with a group photo of students, parents and teachers.

Cast
 Anant Nag as Ananthapadmanabha P., a teacher in criminology and a self-claimed social activist who fights for the survival of S.H.P Shaale, Kasargod. He mentions his surname as "P for peacock."
 Ranjan Saju as Praveena Kumar, a student who failed 7th grade thrice
 Sampath as Mammootty, (named after the Malayalam actor) a student in 6th grade
 Saptha Pavoor as Pallavi, daughter of Upadhyaya and a student in 7th grade, Praveena's crush
 Pramod Shetty as Shantharama Upadhyaya, a well-known Yakshagana artiste and Kannada Activist, Pallavi's father
 Supreetha Shetty as Vasantha Upadhyaya, wife of Upadhyaya, Pallavi's mother
 Mahendra Prasad as Mahendra, a student in 7th grade and best friend of Praveena
 Manish Heroor as Mute Student in 7th grade and best friend of Praveena
 Democracy Sohan Shetty as Satheesha, a student in 7th grade
 Prakash Thuminad as Bhujanga, an areca nut grower 
 Ramesh Bhat as Anantha Padmanabha M., a social activist and neighbor of Anantha Padmanabha P. He mentions his surname as "M for match-fixing".
 Rishab Shetty as Inspector Kemparaju (cameo), a police inspector in Mysuru
 Shanil Guru as Raghava, cook in Upadhyaya's house
 Balakrishna Panikker as Balakrishna Panikker, Assistant Education Officer of Kasargodu
 Radhakrishna as Sebastian, watcher of a mansion which is owned by a Dubai resident
 Rajeev Shetty as Raamanna Rai 
 Pushparaj Bollar as Driver Govindu, Raamanna's driver
Arpith Adyar as "Reporter cum photographer"

Production

Filming
The film was shot in 55 days at one stretch.

Soundtrack

Vasuki Vaibhav has composed the songs and B. Ajaneesh Loknath has composed background score for the film. The lyrics for the songs are written by K. Kalyan, Trilok Trivikrama, Avinash Balekkala, Veeresh Shivamurthy and Vasuki Vaibhav.

Reception
The movie has received positive reviews.

Awards

Outside Karnataka

More than 3,000 students were reported to have watched the film at Kasargod. The Kannada Sangha members of Chandigarh made it possible to play the Kannada Naadageete before the screening of the movie. It was reported that the movie had the highest ticket sales in Mumbai compared to any Kannada movie released there earlier. It was also the first Kannada movie to be released after 12 years in Thiruvananthapuram (two centres) and in Vizag (one centre) and first Kannada movie to have its posters spread over 12 areas in Chennai.

Satellite rights

The satellite and digital rights were secured by Udaya TV and Sun NXT where the film had its World Television Premiere on 23 December 2018 at 6:00p.m. IST

Box office

The movie got positive response from both audience and critics. It completed 100 days in theatres and was a blockbuster hit.

References

External links 
 

Indian coming-of-age films
Films set in Karnataka
Films set in schools
2010s Kannada-language films
Best Children's Film National Film Award winners
2010s coming-of-age films
Films directed by Rishab Shetty